The 3rd Combat Engineer Regiment (3 CER) is an Australian Army modular engineer regiment trained for sapper/combat engineer operations. The unit is based at Lavarack Barracks in Townsville, Queensland and is part of the 3rd Brigade. It has deployed to Bougainville as part of the South Pacific Peacekeeping Force, to the Solomon Islands under Operation Anode, and has also served in Timor-Leste, Iraq and Afghanistan.

Structure
The regiment consists of:
 Regimental Headquarters
 16 Combat Engineer Squadron
 18 Combat Engineer Squadron
 25 Support Squadron
 Operational Support Squadron

Notes

References

Engineer regiments of Australia
Military units involved in UN peacekeeping missions
Military units in Queensland